Vinícius de Lima Ferreira (born 3 April 1998), also known as Vinícius Jaú, is a Brazilian professional footballer who plays as a forward for Londrina, on loan from Avaí.

Career
Born in Jaú, São Paulo, Vinícius made his professional debut with Portuguese team Benfica B in a 2–1 away loss to Oliveirense in LigaPro on 8 August 2018.

On 6 February 2020, Vinícius returned to Brazil and joined Avaí FC.

Honours
Benfica
UEFA Youth League runner-up: 2016–17

References

External links
 
 

1998 births
Living people
Brazilian footballers
Association football forwards
Club Athletico Paranaense players
S.L. Benfica B players
Avaí FC players
Liga Portugal 2 players
Campeonato Brasileiro Série B players
Expatriate footballers in Portugal
Brazilian expatriate sportspeople in Portugal
Footballers from São Paulo (state)
People from Jaú